Barbora is a Czech and Slovak female given name. It was derived from the Greek word barbaros meaning "foreign", a variant of "Barbara". It is the 36th most popular given name in the Czech Republic (as of 2007). Notable people with the name include:

Barbora Bobuľová (born 1974), Slovak actress
Barbora Bukovská, Czech-Slovak human rights attorney
Barbora Dibelková (born 1983), Czech race walker
Barbora Kodetová (born 1970),Czech actress
 Barbora Krejčíková (born 1995), Czech Tennis Player. 
 Barbora Seemanová (born 2000), Czech Swimmer
Barbora Silná (born 1989), Czech-Austrian ice dancer
Barbora Špotáková (born 1981), Czech javelin thrower
Barbora Štefková (born 1995), Czech tennis player
Barbora Strýcová (born 1986), Czech tennis player

See also
Barbara (given name)
Varvara (disambiguation)

References

Czech feminine given names
Slovak feminine given names